Daniel W. Bradley (born 13 July 1941) is an important American virologist who, along with Michael Houghton, Qui-Lim Choo and George Kuo at Chiron Corporation, worked to help isolate the Hepatitis C virus in 1989. He graduated from San José State University in 1964 before going on to receive a master's degree in biochemistry from the University of California and a doctorate from the University of Arizona. He worked for the Centers for Disease Control and Prevention starting in 1971. He received the Karl Landsteiner Memorial Award of the American Association of Blood Banks in 1992, the Robert Koch Prize in 1993, and the Gairdner Foundation International Award in 2013.

References

1941 births
Living people
American virologists
San Jose State University alumni
University of California alumni
University of Arizona alumni